Meet Simon Cherry is a 1949 British mystery film directed by Godfrey Grayson, and an adaptation of the popular BBC radio series Meet the Rev., featuring the crime solving cleric.

Plot
When the Rev. Simon Cherry (Hugh Moxey) sets off for a much needed holiday, his car breaks down and he is forced to stay overnight in a manor house   belonging to Lady Harling (Courtney Hope). The following morning, the body of Lady Harling's invalid daughter (Zena Marshall) is discovered, apparently murdered, and the Rev. Simon Cherry must bring his crime solving skills to the case.

Cast
 Hugh Moxey as Simon Cherry 'The Rev'  
 Jeannette Tregarthen as Monica Harling  
 Anthony Forwood as Alan Colville  
 Ernest Butcher as Young  
 Zena Marshall as Lisa Colville  
 John Bailey as Henry Dantry  
 Courtney Hope as Lady Harling  
 Gerald Case as Dr. Smails  
 Arthur Lovegrove as Charlie Banks 
 John Arnatt as Tommy

Critical reception
The Radio Times gave the film one out of five stars, regretting its "feeble story"; Sky Movies gave the film two out of five stars, noting a "a brisk, no-nonsense film version of one of Gale Pedrick's popular stories"; and TV Guide rated it similarly, calling it, "competent enough."

References

Bibliography
 Chibnall, Steve & McFarlane, Brian. The British 'B' Film. Palgrave MacMillan, 2009.

External links

1949 films
British mystery films
1949 mystery films
Films directed by Godfrey Grayson
Films set in country houses
Films based on radio series
Hammer Film Productions films
British black-and-white films
1940s English-language films
1940s British films